Sanctity was an American thrash metal band from Asheville, North Carolina. They formed in 1998 and released Road to Bloodshed in 2007. They were in the midst of writing material for another album, with an undisclosed new vocalist, which did not have a chance to come to fruition before the band's dissolution in 2008. Founder, songwriter and lead guitarist Zeff now has a separate project named Graveyard Fields and Jeremy, Jared and Derek also have a project together.

History 
After touring extensively around the North Carolina, Tennessee and South Carolina areas, Sanctity got their break after Trivium saw the band perform live at a gig in South Carolina. Matt Heafy, impressed with what he saw, received the band's recorded material, and passed it on to Roadrunner's A&R person Monte Conner.

In late 2005 the band self-financed and produced a music video for their song "Zeppo" with director Ramon Boutviseth. They were signed to Roadrunner and toured the US as a supporting act for DragonForce in the first half of 2006. Megadeth's Dave Mustaine caught Sanctity's set at one of these shows and personally invited the band to join his summer metalfest Gigantour. Later that year, Sanctity supported labelmates Trivium on their first headlining tour of the US, and Children of Bodom on their US tour at the end of the year.
The band released its debut album Road to Bloodshed in April 2007, following the production and subsequent release of the music video for "Beneath the Machine", also directed by Boutviseth. They supported Trivium on their European tour along with Gojira and Annihilator, and opened for Zakk Wylde's band Black Label Society on the first leg of their spring US tour.
Following the completion of a summer US tour with progressive metallers Symphony X, Sanctity set out on another US run in support of Machine Head alongside Arch Enemy and Throwdown. The music video for "Beloved Killer" was released shortly thereafter. In October 2007, the band embarked on their first headlining run, touring the UK with Evile and Romeo Must Die.

Lineup changes in 2008 
North Carolina thrashers Sanctity have issued the following update:

"Yes, the rumors are true, Jared [MacEachern; vocals, rhythm guitar] and Derek [Anderson, bass] have left Sanctity for personal reasons. Originally we were planning to announce the addition of Brian Stephenson on guitar during the Sonata Arctica tour, but things have changed in the last two months. Jared just had a beautiful baby girl in December and decided that being a good father was the most important thing and Sanctity agrees. During this time Derek had a situation at home and came to a mutual decision to leave Sanctity as well.

"Despite having two members leave, Sanctity continues instead of flaking out and dropping off a tour we were obligated to. Brian stepped up as our new vocalist and we have hometown friends Zach Jordan and Scott Smith (both in Above the Means) filling in on guitar and bass respectively.

"Perseverance is nothing new to Sanctity, we've dealt with everything from gear being stolen, being stranded in Wisconsin, bus accidents and now this.

"Once Sanctity is back home we'll be deciding on a permanent lineup, but we're having a blast tearing it up in Canada with Sonata Arctica, braving this crazy −55 degree weather."

Members 

 Zach Jordan – rhythm guitar
 Zeff Childress – lead guitar
 Scott Smith – bass
 Jeremy London – drums

Former 
 Nate Queen – vocals
 Brian Stephenson – vocals (touring)
 Jared MacEachern – vocals, rhythm guitar (guitar/vocals debut album)
 Derek Anderson – bass (played bass on debut album)
 Billy Moody – bass (left during the making of debut album)
 Joey Cox – vocals
 Danny Lanier – bass

Discography 
Since their adoption to Roadrunner Records, Sanctity have released one studio album.

 Road to Bloodshed (2007)

Demos 
 Untitled (2003)
 "Harvest" – 4:18
 "Images" – 4:36
 "Two Days from Yesterday" – 4:12

 Untitled (2005)
 "Driftwood"
 "Lost to Ego"
 "Seconds"
 "Brotherhood"

EPs 
 Bedroom Sessions (2004)
 "Shallow Lies" – 3:43
 "Flatline" – 4:27
 "Two Days" – 4:08
 "Lament" – 1:54
 "Zeppo" – 5:35

Music videos

Awards

References

External links 

Official website

Sanctity at Roadrunner Records
Photos from Worcester, MA 9/21/07 at Thrashmag.com

Heavy metal musical groups from North Carolina
Roadrunner Records artists
Musical groups established in 2000